Helen Conkling (born 1933) is an American poet. Her work has appeared in the Antioch Review, Georgia Review, the Hudson Review, Chicago Review, the Ohio Review and Prairie Schooner. In 1996, she was the recipient of the Agnes Lynch Starrett Poetry Prize.

Works
"Snakes", Poetry Daily
"Never to Go Out in a City in the Rain,” “December 1941,” and “At the Winter Solstice”, Traffic East, Issue 3

Notes

References

1933 births
Living people
Agnes Lynch Starrett Poetry Prize winners
American women poets
21st-century American women